"Blue Kiss" is the debut solo single by American musician Jane Wiedlin. Written by Wiedlin and American singer/songwriter Randell Kirsch, the song is from Wiedlin's 1985 self-titled debut album and is her first solo single after having left the all-female rock band the Go-Go's. It reached No. 77 on the Billboard Hot 100 and No. 30 on the Hot Dance Club Play chart.

The 7" single was backed by the parent album's closing album track "My Travelling Heart", a Celtic-flavored ballad that deals with Wiedlin's feelings about the breakup of the band. An extended 12-inch single was also released, featuring an instrumental version of "Blue Kiss", along with two extended dance versions, one of which was remixed by famed Madonna collaborator William Orbit.

Two music videos were produced for the song - one was not released, the other features Jane playing her guitar and singing in the back of a truck travelling a back-road.

"Blue Kiss" can be heard during the frat house party scene in the film Night of the Creeps (1986), and was used during the date montage scene in the sci-fi indie film The iDol (2007).

Track listing
7"
 "Blue Kiss" (Randall Kirsch, Wiedlin) – 3:27
 "My Travelling Heart" (Wiedlin) – 4:07

 12" Maxi
 "Blue Kiss (Special Dance Version)" – 6:30 (mixed by John "Tokes" Potoker)
 "Blue Kiss ("V" Mix)" – 6:12 (mixed by Vince Ely)
 "Blue Kiss (Instrumental)" – 4:18 (mixed by John "Tokes" Potoker)

 UK 12"
 "Blue Kiss (Dance Mix)"
 "Blue Kiss (Instrumental)"
 "My Travelling Heart"

Chart positions

References

1985 songs
1985 debut singles
Jane Wiedlin songs
Songs written by Jane Wiedlin
I.R.S. Records singles